Melvin Boban George (born 5 November 1990) is a Liberian professional footballer who currently play as a midfielder for Hanthawaddy United F.C. in the Myanmar National League.

International 
In March  and May 2016, Melvin was invited to join the Liberian National Team in their AFCON Qualification matches. He was part of the 19 foreign players call up by coach Debbah.

References 

 libfootball.com
 
 liberiafa.com
 worldfootball.net
 liberiansoccer.com

External links
 
 cafonline.com

1990 births
Living people
Liberian expatriate footballers
Liberia international footballers
Sportspeople from Monrovia
Association football midfielders
Expatriate footballers in Myanmar
Liberian footballers
Hanthawaddy United F.C. players
Myanmar National League players